Coca-Cola 500 may refer to the following NASCAR races:

 Coca-Cola 500 (Pocono) (1977–1980), race held at Pocono Raceway, now named the Pocono 350
 Coca-Cola 500 (Atlanta) (1981–1985), race at Atlanta Motor Speedway, now named the Kobalt Tools 500
 Coca-Cola 500 (Motegi), a 1998 exhibition NASCAR stock car race held in Japan

See also
 Coca-Cola 600, the current NASCAR race held at Charlotte Motor Speedway in Concord, North Carolina on Memorial Day